Toto, Peppino and the Outlaws is a 1956 Italian comedy film directed by Camillo Mastrocinque.

For this film Peppino De Filippo was awarded with a Silver Ribbon for best supporting actor.

Plot
Antonio and Peppino live in a small town in central Italy: Peppino is the barber, Totò is maintained by the rich but avaricious wife Teresa, who does not allow him in any way to have fun, as Antonio would like. One day Antonio and Peppino take advantage of the fact that the bandit "Il Torchio" has returned to terrorizing the country, pretending to be kidnapped by the band. The two astutely send a message with threats to Teresa, asking for money for the payment of the ransom, with which they go to spend a night of joy. Teresa, however, learns the truth and is furious, and does not believe the stories of Antonio, even when he is really kidnapped by the "Torchio".

Cast 
 Totò: Antonio
 Peppino De Filippo: Peppino
 Titina De Filippo: Teresa
 Dorian Gray: Valeria
 Franco Interlenghi: Alberto
 Maria Pia Casilio: Rosina
 Barbara Shelley: la baronessa
 Teddy Reno: himself 
 Memmo Carotenuto: Ignazio detto "il Torchio"
 Mario Castellani: il braccio destro del Torchio

References

External links

1956 films
Films directed by Camillo Mastrocinque
Italian buddy comedy films
Films with screenplays by Ruggero Maccari
Films set in Rome
1950s buddy comedy films
Films set in Lazio
1956 comedy films
Films scored by Alessandro Cicognini
1950s Italian films
Italian black-and-white films